Fredrik Erixon is a Swedish economist, writer and director of ECIPE. He was educated at the University of Oxford, the London School of Economics and Uppsala University, and is married with two children. Since co-founding ECIPE in 2006 with professor Razeen Sally, he has led it to become one of Brussels’ leading research-based institutes, which was awarded with several prizes.

Before co-founding ECIPE, he was an adviser to the British government and the chief economist of Timbro. His career began as an economist in the Prime Minister's Office in Sweden, later working at the World Bank and for JP Morgan as an emerging market analyst.

In 2010, Erixon was awarded as one of Brussels 30 most influential people. He has written several books and conducted several studies regarding economic policy, international economics and regulatory affairs, and has advised numerous governments in various countries. He is a frequent speaker at conferences.

References

External links
 ECIPE website

Living people
Swedish economists
Swedish male writers
Year of birth missing (living people)